Fjärås kyrkby is a locality situated in Kungsbacka Municipality, Halland County, Sweden, with 2,321 inhabitants in 2010. It is located at the shore of lake Lygnern.

References 

Populated places in Kungsbacka Municipality